Baumgartner Fine Art Restoration, commonly known as Baumgartner Restoration, is a Chicago-based art conservation studio operating a YouTube channel of the same name.

History 
In 1978, Rene Agass Baumgartner established the studio in Chicago; his son Julian took over the studio after Agass' death in 2011 at age 63. In 2016, Julian started a YouTube channel documenting himself restoring various artworks, becoming well-received and attracting media coverage.

References

External links 

 
 

Arts organizations established in 1978
Conservation and restoration companies
YouTube channels launched in 2016
Artist groups and collectives based in Chicago